The men's 66 kilograms Kurash competition at the 2018 Asian Games in Jakarta was held on 28 August 2018 at the Jakarta Convention Center Assembly Hall. Kurash made its debut at the 2018 Asian Games. Earlier, it was incorporated into the 2017 Asian Indoor and Martial Arts Games.

Kurash is a traditional martial art from Uzbekistan that resembles Wrestling. There are three assessment system in Kurash, namely Halal, Yambosh, and Chala. It is a form of upright jacket wrestling and is played by two athletes, one wearing a green jacket and the other a blue jacket.

Schedule
All times are Western Indonesia Time (UTC+07:00)

Results

Final

Top half

Bottom half

References

External links
Official website

men's 66 kg